Isaac Christopher Rochell (born April 22, 1995) is an American football defensive end for the Las Vegas Raiders of the National Football League (NFL). He played college football at Notre Dame, and was drafted in the seventh round of the 2017 NFL Draft by the Los Angeles Chargers. Rochell also played with the Indianapolis Colts in 2021 and the Cleveland Browns in 2022.

College career
A three-year starter at the University of Notre Dame, Rochell's performance was strong his junior year but faded near the end of his senior year. He recorded slightly fewer tackles but had a sack and ten quarterback hurries. Rochell was noted for his consistency and work ethic even when the Fighting Irish were not finding success on the field.

Professional career

Los Angeles Chargers
Rochell was drafted by the Los Angeles Chargers in the seventh round (225th overall) in the 2017 NFL Draft. He was waived on September 13, 2017, and was re-signed to the practice squad. He was promoted to the active roster on December 12, 2017.

Rochell re-signed with the Chargers on April 21, 2020.

Indianapolis Colts
Rochell signed with the Indianapolis Colts on March 22, 2021.

Cleveland Browns
On April 20, 2022, Rochell signed with the Cleveland Browns. The Browns terminated Rochell's contract on August 31, 2022. He was signed to the Browns' practice squad on September 1, 2022. He was promoted to the active roster on September 21. He was waived on November 12, 2022. He was re-signed to the practice squad three days later. He terminated his practice squad contract on December 28, 2022.

Las Vegas Raiders
On December 28, 2022, Rochell signed with the Las Vegas Raiders, just hours after he terminated his practice squad contract with the Cleveland Browns.

Personal life
Rochell is married to Allison Kucharczyk, whom he met while attending University of Notre Dame.

References

External links
Notre Dame Fighting Irish bio

1995 births
Living people
American football defensive ends
Cleveland Browns players
Indianapolis Colts players
Las Vegas Raiders players
Los Angeles Chargers players
Notre Dame Fighting Irish football players
People from McDonough, Georgia
Players of American football from Georgia (U.S. state)